Max O'Reilly (born 26 February 2000) is an Irish rugby union player, currently playing for Pro14 and European Rugby Champions Cup side Leinster's academy. His preferred position is centre. O'Reilly made his debut for Leinster during a 24–35 home defeat to Connacht on 2 January 2021.

National team
O'Reilly has represented the Ireland national rugby sevens team on the World Rugby Sevens Series. He debuted for the national sevens team in the 2019 European Grand Prix Sevens.

References

External links
itsrugby.co.uk Profile

2000 births
Living people
Irish rugby union players
Leinster Rugby players
Rugby union centres
Rugby union players from County Wicklow